"Wilderworld" is a song by New Zealand-Australian rock band Dragon released in July 1984 as the fourth single from the group's seventh studio album Body and the Beat (1984). The song peaked at number 42 on the Australian Kent Music Report.

Track listing 
 "Wilderworld" (Johanna Pigott, Todd Hunter, Marc Hunter) – 3:51
 "Easy Street" (Bruce Smeaton) (from the film Street Hero) -

Charts

References 

Dragon (band) songs
1984 singles
1983 songs
Polydor Records singles
Mercury Records singles
Songs written by Marc Hunter
Songs written by Todd Hunter
Songs written by Johanna Pigott